The 2022 season is Albirex Niigata Singapore FC's 19th consecutive season in the top flight of Singapore football and in the S.League, having joined the Sleague in 2004. Along with the 2022 Singapore Premier League, the club will also compete in the Singapore Cup and the Singapore League Cup.

The female team will be playing in the Women's Premier League (Singapore).

Squad

SPL Squad

U19 Squad

Women Squad

Coaching staff

Transfer

In 

Pre-season

Note 1: Ilhan Fandi signs for the club and join after completing his NS stint in April 2022.

Loan In 
Pre-season

Loan Return 
Pre-season

Note 1: Reo returned to the club on loan after successful negotiation for another season.

Note 2: Zamani Zamri returns to the club after completing his NS stint in April 2022.

Out 
Pre-season

Loan Out

Retained / Extension / Promoted

Rumours 
Pre-Season

Friendly

Pre-season friendlies

In Season friendlies 

Notes

Team statistics

Appearances and goals 
As at 18 Nov 2022

Appearances and goals (Women)

Competitions

Overview

Charity Shield

Singapore Premier League

Singapore Cup

Group

Semi-final 

Albirex Niigata (S) lost 7–5 on aggregate.

3rd/4th placing

Competition (Women's Premier League)

Women's Premier League

League table

Competition (U21)

Stage 1 

 League table

Stage 2 

 League table

See Also 
 2014 Albirex Niigata Singapore FC season
 2015 Albirex Niigata Singapore FC season
 2016 Albirex Niigata Singapore FC season
 2017 Albirex Niigata Singapore FC season
 2018 Albirex Niigata Singapore FC season
 2019 Albirex Niigata Singapore FC season
 2020 Albirex Niigata Singapore FC season
 2021 Albirex Niigata Singapore FC season
 2022 Albirex Niigata Singapore FC season

Notes

References 

Albirex Niigata Singapore FC
Albirex Niigata Singapore FC seasons
2022
1